The Hostages is a 1975 British adventure film directed by David Eady and starring Stephen Garlick, Jayne Collins, Peter Marshall, Julian Holloway and Robin Askwith.

Cast
Peter - 	Stephen Garlick
Kate - 	Jayne Collins
Tim - 	Peter Marshall
Helen - 	Lucinda Gorell-Barnes
Joe Blake - 	Ray Barrett
Terry Sladden - 	Robin Askwith
Policeman - 	Jeremy Bulloch

References

External links

1975 films
1970s children's adventure films
Films directed by David Eady
British children's adventure films
Children's Film Foundation
1970s English-language films
1970s British films